John (Johnnie) Walker (born 1805, Kilmarnock–1857) was a Scottish grocer, who originated what would become one of the world's most famous whisky brand names, Johnnie Walker, despite the fact he was himself a teetotaler.

Biography
John Walker was born in 1805 near Kilmarnock in East Ayrshire. When his father Alexander died in 1820, he was left £417 in trust. In 1820, the trustees invested in an Italian warehouse, grocery, and wine and spirits shop on the High Street in Kilmarnock.

In 1833, John married Elizabeth Purves. He was a respected businessman, leader of the local trade association, and a Freemason.  His store's stock was almost entirely destroyed in an 1852 flood, but the business recovered within a couple of years. His own whisky brand, then known as "Walker's Kilmarnock Whisky" was popular locally, although John Walker himself was a teetotaler.

John's son Alexander Walker (named after John's father) had apprenticed with a tea merchant in Glasgow, and there learned the art of blending tea. When he returned to take over the business from his ailing father, he used those skills to create Old Highland Whisky (eventually renamed Johnnie Walker Black Label), the blend that made Johnnie Walker whisky famous.

As one writer put it:

The Scottish cricketer John Walker, who was later a senior director at John Walker and Co. was a direct descendant of Walker.

References

Additional sources
 Scotch Whisky: A Liquid History by Charles MacLean. 2003 Charles MacLean & Cassell Illustrated. 

1805 births
1857 deaths
People from East Ayrshire
19th-century Scottish businesspeople
Drink distillers
People from Kilmarnock